Ledinci also known as Novi Ledinci is a suburban settlement located in the Petrovaradin municipality, one of two municipalities of the city of Novi Sad, Serbia. It is situated in the Autonomous Province of Vojvodina. The village is part of the metropolitan area of Novi Sad.

Name
The name of the settlement in Serbian is plural.

Population

Most of the inhabitants are ethnic Serbs.

Geography
The village is geographically located in Srem, but it is part of South Bačka District. There are two villages with this name: Novi Ledinci (New Ledinci) and Stari Ledinci (Old Ledinci). Today, the name "Ledinci" is officially used to designate Novi Ledinci, while other village is officially known as Stari Ledinci. Both villages are located in Petrovaradin municipality, on the brows of Fruška Gora mountain.

History
The village of Novi Ledinci was founded after the Second World War. It was built for inhabitants of Stari Ledinci, since this village was destroyed during the war. Later, the village of Stari Ledinci was rebuilt too.

Family names of the villagers
Some prominent families in the village include: Alimpijević, Antonijević, Arackić, Arsenijević, Avramović, Bačić, Batajić, Božić, Čelić, Čerkez, Dešanović, Dikić, Dimitrijević, Doroci, Đermanov, Florić, Isajević, Jeftić, Jovanović, Kirilović, Kiselica, Kovačević, Krstić, Lukić, Marinković, Matić, Mikerević, Milinković, Milićević Miloradović, Milošević, Milutinović, Mirković, Nikolić, Ninković, Pavlov , Pantelić, Petrić, Petrović, Pisarević, Poguberović, Popović, Prodanović, Prokić, Rakić, Rukavina, Stanković, Suvajdžić, Teodorović, Teofanović, Vojnović, Vrčinac, Vujković, Zaklanac, Zarić, Zoranović, Vasilić, Vukajlović, Stjepanović, Mršić, Vujinović, etc.

Gallery

See also
Stari Ledinci
Ledinci Lake
Fruška Gora
List of places in Serbia
List of cities, towns and villages in Vojvodina

References

Slobodan Ćurčić, Broj stanovnika Vojvodine, Novi Sad, 1996.

External links

Suburbs of Novi Sad
Populated places in Syrmia
South Bačka District